Matija Ferkić or Matija Frkić (1583 – 1669) was a Croatian Franciscan Conventual scholastic philosopher from Krk.

He was from the island of Krk. He was a Scotist, and wrote a Vita et apologia Scoti, a life of Duns Scotus. He taught at the University of Padua for 35 years, from 1629.

He published the works of Philip Faber.

Works

 Apologiae pro Ioanne Duns Scoto doctore subtili libri tres : in Ioannem Fridericum Matenesium, in Abrahamum Bzouium Polonum, in Paulum Iouium Nouocomensem, Bologna, typ. Sebastiano Bonomii, 1620.
 Vita Ioannis Dunsii Scoti, Bologna, typis N. Tebaldini, 1622; Napoli, typ. Giandomenico Roncalioli, 1629.
 Istri seu Danubii ortus aliorumque fluminum ab Aristotele in primo Meteoro inductorum. Accessit Lacus Asphaltitis confirmatio, Padova, ex typ. B. Carectoni, 1632.
 Vestigationes peripateticae, Padova, typ. P. Frambotti, 1639.
 De Fabulis palaestini stagni ad aures Aristotelis, peripateticorum principis, Padova, typ. Giambattista Pasquati, 1641.
 Osservationi sopra il Goffredo del signor Torquato Tasso, Padova, typ. Giambattista Pasquati, 1642.
 De Personis producentibus Spiritum Sanctum, Padova, 1644 [?].
 
 Defensio vestigationum peripateticorum ab offensionibus Belluti et Mastrii, Padova, typ. Giambattista Pasquati, 1646.
 Epitome theologicum M.F. Veglensis ... ex Magistro Sententiarum [i.e. Petrus Lombardus] et ... Jo. [Duns] Scoto, a M.P.M. Rusca ... evulgatum, 4 vol., Padova, 1647.
 Oratio in Ioannem Dunsium Scotum Doctorem Subtilem declamata in Universitate Patavina die tertia novembris 1634, ed. Antonino Poppi, "La santità di Giovanni Duns Scoto nel solco di Francesco d'Assisi e Antonio di Padova", Il Santo. Rivista antoniana di storia, dottrina, arte 33/1 (1993), 121-133.

Notes

External links

 Matija Frkić - an interpreter and critic of Tasso

1583 births
1669 deaths
Conventual Friars Minor
Scholastic philosophers
17th-century Croatian Roman Catholic priests
Croatian theologians
Croatian philosophers
Scotism
Italian people of Croatian descent